Shilique Calhoun (born March 20, 1992) is an American football outside linebacker who is a free agent. He was drafted by the Oakland Raiders in the third round in the 2016 NFL Draft. He played college football at Michigan State.

Early years
Calhoun attended Middletown High School North in Middletown Township, New Jersey. He was a defensive end and tight end for the high school football team. He also played basketball.

College career
Calhoun was redshirted at Michigan State University as a freshman in 2011.

As a redshirt freshman in 2012, he played in all 13 games as a backup. He recorded 6 tackles (2.5 for a loss, including 1 sack) and 2 passes defensed. His first year as starter, as a sophomore in 2013, he posted 37 tackles (14 for a loss, including 7.5 sacks), 1 interception, 4 fumble recoveries, and 2 forced fumbles.  He was named a second team All-American by numerous publications and was a finalist for the Ted Hendricks Award. Although he was eligible for the 2014 NFL Draft, he decided to return for his junior season.  During his junior year in 2014, he posted 39 tackles (12.5 for a loss, including 8 sacks), 1 fumble recovery, and a forced fumble. He was expected to leave college and enter the 2015 NFL Draft, but he returned to school for his senior year and, during the 2015 season, he collected 49 tackles (15 for a loss, including 10.5 sacks), 3 passes defensed, and a forced fumble. He finished his four-year college career with 27 sacks, 131 tackles (44 tackles for a loss), four forced fumbles, five fumble recoveries, and one interception.

Professional career

Oakland Raiders
On April 29, 2016, Calhoun was drafted in the third round (75th overall) of the 2016 NFL Draft. On May 17, 2016, it was announced that Calhoun would wear number 91, formerly held by Justin Tuck. On June 17, 2016, Calhoun signed with the Oakland Raiders. He played in 10 games as a rookie recording nine tackles and a pass defensed before being placed on injured reserve on December 23, 2016.

On September 2, 2017, Calhoun was waived by the Raiders and was signed to the practice squad the next day. He was promoted to the active roster on October 14, 2017.

On September 12, 2018, Calhoun was waived by the Raiders and was re-signed to the practice squad. He was promoted back to the active roster on September 18, 2018. He was placed on injured reserve on December 5, 2018.

New England Patriots
On May 2, 2019, Calhoun was signed by the New England Patriots.

On March 24, 2020, Calhoun was re-signed by the Patriots.

In Week 2 against the Seattle Seahawks on Sunday Night Football, Calhoun recorded his first career sack on Russell Wilson during the 35–30 loss. He was placed on injured reserve on November 14, 2020. He was activated on December 19, 2020.

San Francisco 49ers
On August 10, 2021, Calhoun signed a one-year contract with the San Francisco 49ers. He was released on August 24, 2021.

Kansas City Chiefs
On October 19, 2021, Calhoun was signed to the Kansas City Chiefs practice squad. He was released on January 18, 2022.

On February 9, 2022, Calhoun signed a reserve/future contract. He was waived on August 8, 2022.

References

External links
 Michigan State Spartans bio

1992 births
Living people
21st-century African-American sportspeople
African-American players of American football
Middletown High School North alumni
People from Middletown Township, New Jersey
Players of American football from New Jersey
Sportspeople from Monmouth County, New Jersey
American football defensive ends
Michigan State Spartans football players
Oakland Raiders players
New England Patriots players
San Francisco 49ers players
Kansas City Chiefs players